Governorate or provincial elections are due to be held in Sulaymaniya Governorate in 2009 to replace the governorate council elected in the Iraqi governorate elections of 2005. The remaining governorates outside Iraqi Kurdistan held elections on 31 January 2009. The election will follow the 2009 Iraqi Kurdistan legislative election.

References 

Sulaymaniyah Governorate
2009 Iraqi governorate elections
2009 in Iraqi Kurdistan